The current Indonesian Minister of Villages, Development of Disadvantaged Regions, and Transmigration is Abdul Halim Iskandar since 23 October 2019. The minister is supported by Deputy Minister of Villages, Development of Disadvantaged Regions, and Transmigration which is Budi Arie Setiadi. The Minister administers the portfolio through the Ministry of Villages, Development of Disadvantaged Regions, and Transmigration.

President Abdurrahman Wahid appointed Manuel Kaisiepo as a junior minister equivalent to a deputy minister in charge of the government's strategic program. Then continued by the Megawati government by forming a new ministry called the Ministry of Acceleration of Development in Eastern. Under President Susilo Bambang Yudhoyono administration, state minister post was abolished since 19 October 2011, so that it changed its name to Minister of Development of Disadvantaged Regions. On 26 October 2014, President Joko Widodo announces his cabinet. Transmigration Portfolio is separated from the Ministry of Manpower and merged with the Ministry of Development of Disadvantaged Regions. In the second period, Joko Widodo added a deputy minister to assist the village minister's duties.

List of ministers
From most of its existence, this minister post always held by National Awakening Party politicians, making it unique among many ministries in Indonesia. The following individuals have been appointed as Minister of Villages, Development of Disadvantaged Regions, and Transmigration, or any of its precedent titles:

Political Party:

List of deputy ministers
The following individuals have been appointed as Deputy Minister of Villages, Development of Disadvantaged Regions, and Transmigration, or any of its precedent titles:

Political Party:

See also
 Ministry of Villages, Development of Disadvantaged Regions, and Transmigration

References

Village